The  encompasses the Japanese cities of Kyōto, Ōsaka and Kōbe and their surrounding prefectures.

The term Keihanshin is composed of one character (kanji) of each of the cities, but in their Sino-Japanese reading: kei of Kyōto [京]都; han of Ōsaka 大[阪], shin of Kōbe [神]戸.

Keihanshin
Geography of Kyoto Prefecture
Geography of Osaka Prefecture
Geography of Kobe